WWIZ is a commercial FM radio station in West Middlesex, Pennsylvania, United States, serving the Youngstown, Ohio market broadcasting at 103.9 MHz with an oldies format between January and September or October, and a Christmas format between September or October and January.  It is one of seven radio stations in the Youngstown market owned by Cumulus Broadcasting with studios in "The Radio Center" in Youngstown.

History

WWIZ first signed on the air in October 1972.

Format Flips

On March 31, 2017, WWIZ dropped its active rock format (as "Rock 104") and began stunting with a loop of The Moody Blues' “Nights in White Satin” and The Royal Guardsmen's “Snoopy vs. the Red Baron”, with just a legal ID between the songs. The following day at Noon, the station flipped to classic hits as "Z104" using Westwood One's "Good Time Oldies" satellite feed.

First-in-the-nation Christmas music flips
On October 25, 2019, WWIZ dropped its oldies format and began carrying Christmas music, branded as "Christmas 104", It was the first station in the country to flip to Christmas music for the holiday season and initially appeared to be a stunt. On January 1, 2020, WWIZ ended the Christmas music stunt and returned to its previous oldies format, branded as "Z104".

On September 25, 2020, at 12:25 p.m., WWIZ again flipped to Christmas music. It is the earliest known flip to Christmas music for an FCC-licensed station; the earliest stations, including stunting stations, typically flip to the format in mid-October.

On October 1, 2021, at 12:25 p.m., WWIZ again flipped to Christmas music, branded as "Christmas 104".

In 2022, WWIZ opted not to repeat the excessively early flips of 2020 or 2021, and by October 31 of that year, the station was still playing its regular format. On November 1, 2022, at 12:25 p.m., WWIZ finally flipped to its Christmas music format becoming Christmas 104.

References

External links

WIZ
Radio stations established in 1983
Cumulus Media radio stations
WIZ
Oldies radio stations in the United States